No. 49 Squadron is a unit of the Indian Air Force assigned to Eastern Air Command. The Squadron participates in operations involving air, land and airdrop of troops, equipment, supplies, and support or augment special operations forces, when appropriate.

History
The Paraspears were raised in 1960 at Barrackpore and moved to the present location in May 1986.

Lineage
 Constituted as No. 49 Squadron (Paraspears) on 2 February 1960

Assignments
 Indo-Pakistani War of 1965
 Indo-Pakistani War of 1971
 Operation Pawan
 Operation Cactus

Aircraft
 C-47
 C-119
 AN-32
Dacota

References

049